Garuda Indonesia Flight 200 (GA200/GIA 200) was a scheduled domestic passenger flight of a Boeing 737-400 operated by Garuda Indonesia between Jakarta and Yogyakarta, Indonesia. The aircraft overran the runway, crashed into a rice field and burst into flames while landing at Adisucipto International Airport on 7 March 2007. Twenty passengers and one flight attendant were killed. Both the captain and first officer survived, and were fired shortly after the accident occurred. It was the fifth hull-loss of a Boeing 737 in Indonesia within less than six months.

Background

Aircraft
The aircraft was a Boeing 737-400, registered as PK-GZC, The plane had its first flight in 1992. This is an aircraft of GE Capital Aviation Services, which has previously leased to many airlines before Garuda Indonesia leased it in 2002.. The aircraft had accumulated over 35,200 airframe hours and 37,300 cycles since its first flight in 1992.

Crew 
The captain and pilot in command (PIC) was 44-year-old Muhammad Marwoto Komar, who had been with Garuda Indonesia for more than 21 years. He had 13,421 flight hours, including 3,703 hours on the Boeing 737. The first officer was 30-year-old Gagam Saman Rohmana, who had been with the airline for three years and had 1,528 flight hours, with 1,353 of them on the Boeing 737.

Garuda Indonesia
The national airline of Indonesia (founded in 1949), Garuda Indonesia had received a number of criticisms in the months surrounding the crash. According to Australian aviation experts, Garuda Indonesia had one of the worst safety records among the world's national carriers. Since 1950, Garuda Indonesia has had 13 major accidents. , the most recent was in 2002, when Garuda Indonesia Flight 421 ditched in the Bengawan Solo River due to engine flameout caused by excessive hail ingestion, killing a flight attendant. The deadliest accident was in 1997, when Garuda Indonesia Flight 152 flew into a wooded mountain on approach to Medan, killing 234 people. The managing director of the Centre for Asia Pacific Aviation, Peter Harbison, stated that the major accidents in Indonesian aviation history were all caused by the combinations of airports' and fleets' low safety standards and the poor weather conditions in the area, including severe thunderstorms and other forms of inclement weather.

Flight chronology
Flight GA200 originated in Jakarta and was carrying 133 passengers, 19 of whom were foreigners (10 Australians, 2 Americans, 5 Germans and 2 South Koreans). Several Australian journalists were on the flight, covering the visit of Foreign Affairs Minister Alexander Downer and Attorney-General Philip Ruddock to Java. They were on the flight as the aircraft carrying Australian dignitaries was at capacity.

At around 7:00am local time (UTC+7), the captain attempted to land at Adisutjipto International Airport in Yogyakarta, despite a faulty approach with excess speed and steep descent, and the resulting warnings of copilot and flight system. According to passengers, the aircraft shook violently before it crashed. The aircraft overran the end of the runway, went through the perimeter fence, was heavily damaged when it crossed a road, and stopped in a nearby rice field. A fuel-fed fire raged, which could not be reached by airport fire-suppression vehicles. While most passengers were able to escape, a number of passengers perished inside the burning fuselage.

Captain Komar initially claimed that there was a sudden downdraft immediately before the flight landed, and that the flaps on the aircraft may have malfunctioned.

Aftermath

Investigation
The accident was investigated by the Indonesian National Transportation Safety Committee (NTSC). Australian Federal Police disaster victim identification experts were deployed to the scene to assist with the identification of bodies. Australian Transport Safety Bureau (ATSB) staff assisted at the scene by inspecting the wreckage. The United States' National Transportation Safety Board (NTSB) dispatched a team to assist in the investigation, including representatives from Boeing and the Federal Aviation Administration. The flight recorders (flight data recorder and cockpit voice recorder) were removed from the wreckage and flown to the ATSB's headquarters for further analysis using equipment not yet available in Indonesia. Staff in Australia could not extract data from the cockpit voice recorder, which was then sent to Boeing Renton Factory in Renton, Washington (United States) to be analysed.

Report of the NTSC

After the crew members were interviewed, the wreckage was examined, flight data and cockpit voice recordings were analyzed, and a safety review of the airport was conducted, Indonesia's National Transportation Safety Committee released its final report on 22 October 2007. No evidence was found of any defect or malfunction of the aircraft or its systems that could have contributed to the accident. Records showed only the right thrust reverser had been used for the previous 27 sectors, but a fault condition for the left reverser was reset by engineers before departure for this flight, and both were deployed during the landing roll. The weather was calm.

The key NTSC finding is that the aircraft was flown by the Pilot in Command (PIC) at an excessively steep descent and high airspeed ( rather than the normal  during the approach and landing, resulting in unstable flight. The PIC's attention became fixated on trying to make the first approach work, and he failed to hear the warnings of the copilot and his recommendations to abort the landing and go around, and the repeated warnings from the aircraft flight systems, which were audible in the voice recorder data, notably the "Sink rate" and "pull up" claxons.  The copilot failed to take control of the aircraft in these extraordinary circumstances, as required by airline policy, apparently due to inadequate training. Wing flaps were not fully extended to the maximum 40°, not even to the 15° repeatedly requested by the captain, but only to 5° because the first officer was aware that this was the recommended maximum for that high airspeed, but he failed to notify the captain.

The touchdown, followed by two bounces, began  beyond the nominal touchdown zone. The nose landing gear was severely damaged and broke apart during the following roll. The main engine thrust reversers were deployed 4 seconds after the touchdown, continued for 7 seconds, but were stowed 7 seconds before the aircraft left the end of the paved runway and ploughed through the airport perimeter fence. The nose of the aircraft impacted the roadside embankment and the engines impacted the concrete curb just before that embankment. The aircraft came to rest in the rice paddy field  beyond the runway. It was severely damaged by the impact forces, leading to an intense, fuel-fed fire. Airport fire-control vehicles were unable to reach the crash site through the ruptured fence because of the slope and ditch between there and the road. The firemen were unable to deliver sufficient fire suppression foam on the burning aircraft because the hose that they dragged across the road became punctured by rescue vehicles and onlookers' vehicles driving over it and sharp objects such as the damaged fence. About 45 minutes after the crash, two city fire fighting vehicles arrived and were ordered by an un-qualified person to start hosing the fire with water. The fire was extinguished about 2 hours and 10 minutes after the crash. Coordination and procedures during the rescue were not in accordance with the Airport Emergency Plan (AEP) manual, and lacked coherence.

In summary, the NTSC Report attributed the accident to pilot error.

As of 1 March 2007,  Garuda Indonesia had implemented a new fuel efficiency incentive, which awarded a salary bonus if fuel consumption for a flight was lower than nominal. During his interview with the NTSC, the captain denied that this had influenced his decision not to abort the landing.

Prosecution of the captain
On 4 February 2008, captain Komar was arrested and charged with six counts of manslaughter. The charge carried a penalty up to life imprisonment if the court found the crash was deliberate. Short of that finding, the lesser charge of negligent flying causing death carries a maximum sentence of seven years. The first officer testified that he had told the captain to go around because of excessive speed, and that he then had blacked out due to the severe buffeting.
On 6 April 2009, the captain was found guilty of negligence and sentenced to two years of imprisonment.
The captain's lawyers stated their intention to appeal on the basis that the Convention on International Civil Aviation, to which Indonesia is a party, stipulates that aviation accident investigation reports cannot be used to ascribe blame, but only to determine cause. 
The Garuda Pilots Association and Indonesian Pilots Federation threatened to strike in protest against the conviction.
On 29 September 2009 the Indonesian High Court overturned the conviction,
finding that the prosecutors had failed to prove that the pilot was "officially and convincingly guilty of a crime".
This case was later cited in a report published by the American Bar Association, in a defence of the principle that airline safety is undermined by such prosecutions because the threat of them taking place would impede the investigative processes.

EU ban and Garuda's reform
Following the crash of Flight 200, the European Union (EU) banned all Indonesian airlines from flying into the EU. The ban was a watershed moment for Garuda, leading to widespread reforms within the airline to improve both its safety and service standards. It led to the implementation of the 5-year Quantum Leap improvement program. Garuda's fleet was nearly doubled with the introduction of new aircraft such as the Boeing 737-800 and Airbus A330-300. Garuda also added more destinations by starting or resuming service to destinations such as Amsterdam and London. The European ban on Garuda was lifted in June 2009, two years after the crash, and the airline resumed service to Europe shortly afterwards with the inauguration of a one-stop service from Jakarta to Amsterdam via Dubai.

In popular culture
The crash is featured in the Season 15 premiere of Mayday (Air Crash Investigations). The episode is titled "Fatal Focus".

See also

 Air France Flight 358
 China Southern Airlines Flight 3456 
 Lion Air Flight 583
 Pegasus Airlines Flight 2193 
 TAM Airlines Flight 3054 – Overran the runway and killed all 187 people on board plus 12 on the ground
 Aviation safety
 Engineered materials arrestor system
 Ground effect (aerodynamics)
 List of accidents and incidents involving commercial aircraft
 Pilot error
 Runway safety area

Notes

References

External links

National Transportation Safety Committee
Final Report (Archive Alternate archive)
Media Release – Final NTSC investigation report into the Boeing 737 accident at Yogyakarta on 7 March 2007 involving Garuda Indonesia flight GA200 (Archive)
 Media Release – Laporan Akhir KNKT Penyelidikan Kecelakaan Pesawat Boeing 737 Garuda Indonesia GA200 di Yogyakarta, tanggal 7 Maret 2007 (Archive)

2007 in Indonesia
Accidents and incidents involving the Boeing 737 Classic
Airliner accidents and incidents caused by pilot error
Airliner accidents and incidents involving runway overruns
Aviation accidents and incidents in 2007
Aviation accidents and incidents in Indonesia
Flight 200
March 2007 events in Asia